Mohammad Safiyeh (also Romanized as Moḩammad Şafīyeh; also known as Moḩammad Şa‘īyeh) is a village in Aghili-ye Shomali Rural District, Aghili District, Gotvand County, Khuzestan Province, Iran. At the 2006 census, its population was 78, in 15 families.

References 

Populated places in Gotvand County